The SNP Trade Union Group (TUG) is a constituent structure and the largest affiliated organisation of the Scottish National Party (SNP).  Formed in the mid to late 1960s as the Association of Scottish Nationalist Trade Unionists (ASNTU), the original goals of the organisation were to recruit members to the SNP in the trade union movement and attract Labour-voting trade unionists to Scottish independence. Refounded as the TUG in 2014 in the lead up to the independence referendum, membership grew from 800 in September of that year to 16,000 by July 2015.

Representation in the SNP

The TUG is allowed to send delegates to the SNP's annual National Conference and to National Council meetings, and has one representative on the party's National Executive Committee.

See also
Scottish National Party
Scottish politics
Trade unionism in Scotland

References

Trade Union Group
Trade unions in Scotland
1965 establishments in Scotland
Trade unions established in 1965
Political advocacy groups in Scotland